Gunjō can refer to:

Gunjō (song), a song by Yoasobi
Gunjō (manga), a manga by Ching Nakamura